Statistics of Belgian First Division in the 1895–96 season.

Overview

It was contested by 7 teams, and F.C. Liégeois won the championship.

League standings

Results

See also
1895–96 in Belgian football

References

1895
1895–96 in European association football leagues
1895–96 in Belgian football